"Don't Forget to Remember" also called "Don't Forget to Remember Me" is a country ballad recorded by the Bee Gees, from the album Cucumber Castle. The song was written by Barry and Maurice Gibb. It was produced by the band with Robert Stigwood.

Recording
The song's genre is country like much of what Maurice and Barry wrote together without input from their brother, Robin, but all three brothers have written in the medium at other times, most notably the Kenny Rogers and Dolly Parton hit "Islands in the Stream", and its parent album Eyes That See in the Dark.

The song was recorded at 7 May 1969 same day as the unreleased track "Who Knows What a Room Is". Barry Gibb's lead vocal was in a lower register than usual. Peter Mason, Robin's intended replacement in the group originally sang harmony vocals on the song, as Mason explains, "I did some harmonies, I remember doing three songs, there was 'Don't Forget to Remember' and I put the harmony down on that and two other songs. [I don't know] whether it's a tryout, although he'd said before that he wanted me, because we sat and sang together."

Mason also explained: "When I sit and listen to 'Don't Forget to Remember' I can't really tell whether it's me or not. He ran the tracks and said, 'Can you put a harmony to that?'". The song also sticks out in Mason's memory.

Structure
The song features Barry Gibb singing at a lower pitch than usual. The song's lyrics follow the country-song tradition of romantic laments with its tearful first-person lyrics about a man haunted by a failed love affair he can't put out of his mind. Its melody matches the yearning quality of the lyrics, especially on the chorus, which underpins the forlorn wish Don't forget to remember me/And the love that used to be with glorious runs of ascending notes. On paper, the song seems applicable to the group's usual pop style but their recording uses country-music elements to carry it into that genre, a prominent acoustic guitar cuts through the background orchestration and Barry Gibb adds a Nashville-inspired twang to his vocal.

Release
Maurice's reaction when the song was released was "The thing is that it is Jim Reeves-ish it's rather like 'Oh Lonesome Me' and that sort of song and you'll never forget the melody. It wasn't a deliberate dedication to Jim Reeves - it's just worked out that way". Maurice also explains, "We know we don't want to split up, maybe Colin will want to leave sometime in the future, but we all have different things we've involved in". The single covers of the song, (in all countries) features the three remaining Bee Gees after the departure of Robin Gibb.

The song was re-released in CD by RSO Records as a part in the EP of the same name (1987).

Personnel
 Barry Gibb – lead vocals, acoustic guitar
 Maurice Gibb – harmony vocals, bass guitar, acoustic guitar, piano, mellotron
 Colin Petersen – drums
 Peter Mason – harmony vocals (erased from the final recording)
 Uncredited – orchestral and strings arrangement

Charts

Weekly charts

Year-end charts

Cover versions
 The version of this song by Elton John was released on "12 Top Hits" (Avenue-AVE034)
 Swedish dansband Flamingokvintetten covered the song in 1972, with lyrics in Swedish, as "Jag vill leva mitt liv med dig" ("I want to live my life with you"). 
 Country singer Skeeter Davis covered the song and reached #44 on the country charts with it in 1974. 
 Another country singer Kikki Danielsson covered the song with the original lyrics in English on her 1993 album Jag ska aldrig lämna dig. 
Anna McGoldrick covered this song in 1998.
 Brian Letton covered this song in 1997.
 Daniel O'Donnell (1987), 
 Donna Fargo covered this song in 1978
 John & Anne Ryder covered the song in 1969.
 South African singer Ray Dylan covered the song on his album Goeie Ou Country vol 2.
 Monika Martin has a German Version "Du warst da, als der Sommer kam"

References

1969 singles
Bee Gees songs
Songs written by Barry Gibb
Songs written by Maurice Gibb
Song recordings produced by Robert Stigwood
Country ballads
Pop ballads
Elton John songs
Flamingokvintetten songs
Kikki Danielsson songs
1969 songs
Atco Records singles
Polydor Records singles
Irish Singles Chart number-one singles
Number-one singles in New Zealand
Number-one singles in South Africa